Ruth "Ester" Elisabet Ellqvist (4 October 1880 – 20 November 1918) was a Swedish artist, model and wife of John Bauer, who was a painter and illustrator. She studied at the Royal Swedish Academy of Arts and spent one year studying art in southern Germany and Italy with her husband. She died in 1918 with her husband and three-year-old son when the boat that they sailed on sank, killing all 24 people on board.

Biography

Early life 
Ester Ellqvist was born on 4October 1880 in Ausås, Skåne, daughter of teacher Karl Kristersson Ellqvist, and raised in Stockholm. Ellqvist was a lively person who enjoyed the city's social life.

Education 
Ellqvist studied in the late 1890s at the Technical School (later known as Konstfack) in Stockholm, to gain the skills that she need to gain acceptance at the Royal Swedish Academy of Arts. Her brothers Oscar and Ernst, who became photographers, and sister Gerda, who taught needlework, also attended the technical school.

In 1900 her studies commenced at the Royal Swedish Academy of Arts. The academy began accepting female students in 1864, but there was a different but not equal educational path for women. For instance, nude models were not used for female students. During her time at the academy she also attended classes at the A. Tallbergs school for etchers.

Ellqvist was an ambitious, skilled student during the early stages of the Modernist art movement, and at the end of the National Romanticism period, which was represented in the works of academy artists Carl Larsson, Anders Zorn, Bruno Liljefors and Richard Bergh. Ellqvist and her friends, were among the students of the academy who organized a protest against the conservative views of the school, which resulted in the creation of the influential Konstnärsförbundet (Artists Association).

She graduated in 1905.

Marriage 
She met John Bauer at the Academy of Arts in 1900. They had periods of separation during which they sent each other letters exchanging their innermost desires and concerns.
She married Bauer on 18December 1906. In the beginning of their relationship they were tender and happy with each other. There were times when they were unhappy, partially because they had different aspirations. Ellqvist wanted to live near Stockholm and her husband enjoyed being near the forest. She posed as model for many of his works, like Fairy Princess in which she appears to be an innocent, pure, and unattainable woman. In 1908, financed by Bauer's father, they traveled through southern Germany and Italy for one year to study art.

Ellqvist and Bauer had a son Bengt, who they called "Putte". He was born in 1915.

By 1917, their marriage was in trouble and their love for each other began to dwindle. Ellqvist had essentially given up her own artistic aspirations for her role as a wife.

Death 

Ellqvist, Bauer and their three-year-old son died on 20November 1918 when the SS Per Brahe sailing to Stockholm sank in Lake Vättern, killing all 24 people (8 passengers and 16 crew members) on board. On 18August 1922, the Bauers were buried at the Östra cemetery in Jönköping (in quarter 04 plot number 06).

Career 

In popular culture 
In 1986, Sveriges Television produced and broadcast the movie Ester — om John Bauers hustru ("Ester — About John Bauer's Wife). Ester was played by Lena T. Hansson and John was portrayed by Per Mattsson. The movie was directed by Agneta Elers-Jarleman.

References

Further reading

External links 

 Esther Ellqvist, Woman and artist around 1900 (Swedish)

1880 births
1918 deaths
20th-century Swedish painters
Swedish women painters
20th-century Swedish women artists
People from Skåne County
Artists' models
Deaths due to shipwreck
Accidental deaths in Sweden